The Pakistan national cricket team visited Ireland in May 2011 to play two One Day Internationals. The series was played from 27 to 30 May 2011. Misbah-ul-Haq was the captain of the Pakistanti team while William Porterfield was the captain of the Irish team. Both the matches were won by Pakistan. Paul Stirling of the Irish team scored the maximum number of runs in the series while Saeed Ajmal of Pakistan took 7 wickets in the series.

Squads

ODI series

1st ODI

2nd ODI

References

Ire
2011 in Irish cricket
2011
2011 in cricket
International cricket competitions in 2011